Pleuroacanthites is one of two genera included in the Early Jurassic Pleuroacanthitidae and sole representative of the subfamily Pleuroacanthitinae. The shell of Pleuroacanthites is very evolute, with numerous whorls subcircular in section becoming incipiently keeled in the adult. Early whorls have parabolic nodes, later whorls are covered with oblique line which form a long ventral sinus. Sutures have lytoceratid (moss-like) lobes but more or less phylloid saddle endings.

Distribution 
Jurassic deposits in British Columbia, China and Alaska

References 

 W.J Arkell et al., Systematic Descriptions, Mesozoic Ammonoidea, Treatise on Invertebrate Paleontology, Part L (1957) p. L193

Jurassic ammonites
Ammonite genera
Ammonites of North America